The Canadian Association of Research Libraries (CARL) was established in 1976 and brings together thirty-one research libraries. Twenty-nine members are university libraries, plus Library and Archives Canada (LAC) and the National Research Council Canada National Science Library (NSL).

Mission and objectives 
"CARL provides leadership on behalf of Canada's research libraries and enhances capacity to advance research and higher education. It promotes effective and sustainable knowledge creation, dissemination, and preservation, and public policy that enables broad access to scholarly information."

Strategic Directions for May 2019 to May 2022:
 Advance Open Scholarship
Ensure Enduring Access
 Strengthening Capacity
Demonstrate Impact
 Influencing policy.

CARL members
CARL members include 29 university libraries and 2 federal libraries.

Participating university libraries:

 Brock University	
 Carleton University	
 Concordia University Libraries	
 Dalhousie University	
 McGill University Library
 McMaster University	
 Memorial University of Newfoundland	
 Queen's University	
 Simon Fraser University	
 Toronto Metropolitan University
 University of Alberta Library
 University of British Columbia Library
 University of Calgary	
 University of Guelph	
 University of Manitoba	
 University of New Brunswick	
 University of Ottawa
 University of Regina	
 University of Saskatchewan	
 University of Toronto	
 University of Victoria	
 University of Waterloo	
 University of Western Ontario	
 University of Windsor	
 Université de Montréal	
 Université de Sherbrooke
 Université du Québec à Montréal
 Université Laval	
 York University Libraries

Federal libraries:
 National Science Library
 Library and Archives Canada

Partnership and collaboration
CARL works with a number of other organizations, including: 
 Canadian Federation of Library Associations (CFLA-FCAB)
 Association of Research Libraries (US)
 International Federation of Library Associations and Institutions (IFLA)

See also
 Open access in Canada

References

External links
 http://www.carl-abrc.ca/

Canadian library associations
Organizations established in 1976
1976 establishments in Ontario
Organizations based in Ottawa